The following are Indiana State University presidents. Indiana State is located in Terre Haute, Indiana.

William Albert Jones (1869–1879)
George Pliny Brown (1879–1885)
William Wood Parsons (1885–1921), LL.D., DePauw University
Linnaeus Neal Hines (1921–1933), M.A., Cornell University
Ralph Noble Tirey (1934–1953), M.A., Indiana University
Dr. Raleigh Warren Holmstedt (1953–1965), Ph.D., Columbia Teachers College, Columbia University
Dr. Alan Carson Rankin (1965–1975), D.S.Sc., Syracuse University
Dr. Richard George Landini (1975–1992), Ph.D., University of Florida
Dr. John Moore (1992–2000), Ph.D., Pennsylvania State University
Dr. Lloyd W. Benjamin III (2000–2008) Ph.D., University of North Carolina
Dr. Daniel J. Bradley (2008–2018) Ph.D., Michigan State University
Dr. Deborah J. Curtis (2018–Present) Ph.D., Indiana State University

External links
Past presidents of Indiana State University

Indiana State University people
Indiana State University
Indiana State University